Tribune Broadcasting Company, LLC was an American media company which operated as a subsidiary of Tribune Media, a media conglomerate based in Chicago, Illinois. The group owned and operated television and radio stations throughout the United States, as well as full- or partial-ownership of cable television and national digital subchannel networks.

History 

Tribune's broadcasting unit originated with the June 1924 purchase of Chicago, Illinois radio station WDAP by the Chicago Tribune. The new owners changed the station's call letters to WGN, to match the Tribunes slogan, "World's Greatest Newspaper" first used by Tribune in a February 1909 feature commemorating the 100th anniversary of the birth of Abraham Lincoln and then served as the newspaper's motto from August 29, 1911, until December 31, 1976.
On September 13, 1946, the Federal Communications Commission (FCC) granted Tribune license to operate a television station on channel 9 in Chicago
and then signed-on a television station in Chicago, WGN-TV on April 5, 1948, initially as a dual affiliate of CBS and the DuMont Television Network. Two months later, the Tribunes then-sibling newspaper in New York City, the Daily News, established its own television station, independent WPIX.  WGN-TV became an independent outlet by 1956, and would eventually morph into a pioneering national superstation on November 9, 1978, as its signal was linked to cable and satellite customers across America.

After McCormick succumbed from pneumonia-related complications on April 1, 1955, ownership of WGN-TV-AM, the Chicago Tribune and the News Syndicate Company properties would transfer to the McCormick-Patterson Trust, assigned to the Robert R. McCormick Tribune Foundation in the names of the non-familial heirs of McCormick (whose two marriages never produced any children) and familial heirs of Patterson. (The trust was dissolved in January 1975, with a majority of the trust's former beneficiaries, including descendants of the McCormick and Patterson families, owning stock in the restructured Tribune Company entity – which assumed oversight of all properties previously overseen by the trust – afterward.)
In subsequent years, the Tribune Company gradually expanded its broadcasting unit, of which WGN-TV-AM served as its flagship stations, a tie forged in January 1966, when the subsidiary (sans the WPIX television and radio stations, which continued to be controlled by the Tribune-managed News Syndicate Co. before being fully integrated into the company's main station group following its 1991 sale of the Daily News) was renamed the WGN Continental Broadcasting Company.

The group became known as the Tribune Broadcasting Company in January 1981, but retained the WGN Continental moniker as its de facto business name until 1984 and as the licensee for WGN-TV and WGN Radio thereafter. The company gained its third television and second radio station in 1960, when it purchased KDAL-TV (now KDLH) and KDAL (AM) in Duluth, Minnesota from the estate of the late Dalton LeMasurier (Tribune sold KDAL-TV in 1978 and KDAL radio in 1981); the company would later purchase KCTO (subsequently re-called KWGN-TV) in Denver from J. Elroy McCaw in 1966. Tribune's later television purchases included those of WANX-TV (later renamed WGNX) in Atlanta and WGNO in New Orleans (both in 1983); KTLA in Los Angeles ( in 1985), WPHL-TV in Philadelphia (in 1992). WLVI-TV in Boston (owned from 1994 to 2006); KHTV (now KIAH) in Houston (in 1995); KTTY (now KSWB-TV) in San Diego (in 1996); KCPQ and KTWB-TV (now KZJO) in Seattle (in 1998 and 1999, respectively); and WBDC-TV (now WDCW) in Washington, D.C. (in 1999). WGN-TV and WPIX were the only stations that Tribune had owned since their inceptions. Tribune also operated several local cable television systems from 1977 to 1985.

In 1993, Tribune launched Chicagoland Television (CLTV), a regional cable news channel for the Chicago area, which originally operated separately from the company's other Chicago media properties until it merged its operations with WGN-TV's news department in 2009. In November 1994, Tribune Broadcasting formed a partnership with several minority partners, including Quincy Jones, to form Qwest Broadcasting; Qwest operated as a technically separate company from Tribune (which owned stations in a few markets where Tribune-owned stations, including WATL in Atlanta, which was operated alongside Tribune-owned WGNX); Tribune would later acquire the Qwest stations outright in November 1999.

In January 1995, Tribune Broadcasting became a partner in The WB Television Network, in a joint venture with the Warner Bros. Television division of Time Warner. Tribune initially had a 12.5% ownership interest in the network at its launch and later increased its stake to 22%. In addition, partly as a result of a November 1993 affiliation deal with the network, most of Tribune's television properties were WB affiliates. On July 2, 1996, Tribune acquired Renaissance Broadcasting, which owned Fox- and WB-affiliated stations in several large and mid-sized markets.

On January 24, 2006, Time Warner announced that it would partner with CBS Corporation to form a new network that would feature The WB and CBS-owned UPN's higher-rated shows mixed with newer series, called The CW Television Network. All but three of Tribune's 19 WB affiliates (including three that were sold off to other companies later that year) became affiliates of The CW on September 18, 2006, through ten-year agreements (the exceptions were in Philadelphia, Seattle and Atlanta, due to The CW affiliating with CBS-owned stations in those markets), though Tribune itself would not exercise an ownership stake in The CW as it did with The WB.

In April 2007, Tribune's broadcasting interests were included in the sale of the entire company to Chicago investor Sam Zell, who planned take the publicly traded company private. The deal was completed on December 20, 2007.

On December 21, 2007, Tribune and Oak Hill Capital Partners-controlled Local TV, LLC announced plans to collaborate in the formation of a "broadcast management company" (later named The Other Company); its Tribune Interactive division also operated the websites of its stations as part of the partnership.

On December 8, 2008, Tribune announced that it would voluntarily restructure its debt obligations, as part of its filing for Chapter 11 bankruptcy protection in the United States Bankruptcy Court. As the company had sufficient funds to do so, Tribune continued to operate its newspaper publishing and broadcasting, and interactive businesses without interruption during the restructuring.

On January 1, 2011, Tribune launched the digital broadcast network Antenna TV, a service that features a variety of classic television series, including programming from Sony Pictures Television and D.L. Taffner Entertainment. On May 13, 2013, Tribune announced that it would buy a 50% stake in the This TV digital broadcast network from fellow Chicago-based media company Weigel Broadcasting; Tribune took over operational duties for the network on November 1, 2013.

Split and subsequent transactions
On July 1, 2013, Tribune announced that it would purchase the 19 stations owned by Local TV, LLC outright for $2.725 billion; the purchase expanded the number of Big Three network affiliates in its portfolio from one to 10 (most of Tribune's television stations prior to the purchase had either been independent stations or from 1995 onward, affiliates of networks that have launched since 1986; New Orleans station WGNO (channel 26) – an ABC affiliate – was Tribune's only station affiliated with one of the three pre-1986 networks prior to the purchase), as well as form duopolies involving stations in Denver and St. Louis where the two companies maintained local marketing agreements. In order to prevent conflicts with newspaper cross-ownership restrictions (specifically, with Daily Press and The Morning Call), three stations involved in the acquisition – the Norfolk, Virginia duopoly of WTKR (channel 3) and WGNT (channel 27), and Scranton, Pennsylvania station WNEP-TV (channel 16) – were sold to Dreamcatcher Broadcasting and are operated by Tribune under shared services agreements (Tribune has an option to purchase WNEP after the publishing/broadcasting split, although such a transfer may be complicated by possible FCC action on a proposal to end a "discount" in television station ownership limits that count UHF stations to half a percentage to a group's overall market reach, which would put Tribune just over the current limit of 39%, under which the company's current station holdings after the Local TV purchase would be grandfathered). The Federal Communications Commission approved the acquisition on December 20, and the sale was completed one week later on December 27.

Aborted merger with Sinclair; acquisition by Nexstar 
On February 29, 2016, Tribune Media announced that it would review various "strategic alternatives" to increase the company's value to shareholders, which include a possible sale of the entire company and/or select assets, or the formation of programming alliances or strategic partnerships with other companies, due to the decrease in its stock price since the Tribune Publishing spin-off and a $385 million revenue write-down for the 2015 fiscal year, partly due to original scripted programming expenditures for WGN America since it converted the cable network from a superstation in 2014.

With the FCC reinstating the "UHF discount" rule, reports surfaced in late April 2017 that multiple parties were attempting to make offers for Tribune, including Sinclair Broadcast Group, Nexstar Media Group, and a partnership between 21st Century Fox and Blackstone Group. On May 7, 2017, it was reported that Sinclair Broadcast Group was nearing a deal to purchase Tribune Media, and that 21st Century Fox had dropped its bid for the company.

On May 8, 2017, Sinclair Broadcast Group officially announced its intent to acquire Tribune Media. The transaction would have been a cash-and-stock deal valuing the company at $3.9 billion. Depending on regulatory changes or decisions, some divestitures might have been required. However, on August 9, 2018, Tribune canceled the Sinclair deal. On November 14, 2018, it was reported that Nexstar was a leading bidder to acquire Tribune. On December 3, 2018, Nexstar announced its intent to merge with Tribune Media for $6.4 billion ($4.1 billion for all of Tribune's shares in cash and $2.3 billion of Tribune's debt). The merge would give the company 216 stations in 118 markets, placing it just below the FCC's market cap of 39% of TV households and making it the largest owner of television stations in the United States. On August 1, 2019, the United States Department of Justice approved the deal between Nexstar Media Group and Tribune Media. The sale was approved by the FCC on September 16, and occurred on September 19.

Television production and distribution

Tribune Entertainment 

Tribune Entertainment was Tribune's television production, syndication and advertising sales subsidiary. Founded in 1981, this subsidiary produced and/or distributed several first-run syndicated programs including most notably Geraldo, Soul Train, and the U.S. Farm Report; Tribune Entertainment's production and syndication divisions were shut down in December 2007.

Tribune Studios 

On March 19, 2013, Tribune Company announced its return to television production with the formation of Tribune Studios (not to be confused with the Los Angeles studio facility that formerly held the same name until its sale by Tribune to private equity firm Hudson Capital in 2008, and was subsequently renamed Sunset Bronson Studios). The new company will produce programs primarily for Tribune Broadcasting's television stations and WGN America, some of which will receive national distribution. On September 17, 2019, Tribune Studios, the television parent of Tribune Broadcasting, was acquired by Nexstar, and 
the television company went disbanded shortly.

Tribune-owned stations 
Tribune Broadcasting owned 39 television stations located in 33 markets (including eight duopolies). 31 of its stations were affiliated with each of the post-1986 broadcast networks: 14 were affiliated with Fox (not counting a satellite station of KDVR), 12 with The CW and three with MyNetworkTV (not counting a digital subchannel of WQAD-TV). In addition, the company owned five CBS affiliates (not counting a satellite of WTTV), two ABC affiliates, two NBC affiliates and one independent station (not counting a digital subchannel of WTTV). It also provided operational services to three stations (one ABC affiliate, one CBS affiliate and one CW affiliate – the latter two were also operated as part of a duopoly) in the respective markets of Norfolk-Hampton Roads-Newport News, Virginia and Scranton-Wilkes-Barre, Pennsylvania through shared services agreements with Dreamcatcher Broadcasting.

WGN Radio was the company's sole remaining radio station and served as the flagship station for a regional distribution service known as the Tribune Radio Network. Its primary features were farm reports from longtime WGN agriculture broadcasters Orion Samuelson and Max Armstrong. Tribune Radio Network formerly handled distribution of the Chicago Cubs Radio Network to its affiliates until the 2014 season, when the Cubs radio broadcasts in Chicago moved to WBBM radio in 2015, then WSCR in 2016; as a result, affiliate distribution of the Chicago Cubs Radio Network to its partner stations is now handled by Entercom. WGN also maintains a second online-only service known as WGN.FM (alternately known as "The G").

Television stations 
Stations are listed alphabetically by state and city of license.

Note:
 (**) – Indicates a station that was built and signed-on by Tribune.
 (¤¤) – Indicates a station owned by Renaissance Broadcasting prior to its acquisition by Tribune in 1997. KDVR and WCCT (as WTXX) were divested by Renaissance years prior, only to be acquired by Tribune in future acquisitions.
 (++) – Indicates a station owned by Local TV LLC prior to its acquisition by Tribune in 2013.
 (‡‡) – Indicates a station owned by Dreamcatcher Broadcasting, LLC, Tribune operated these stations through Local marketing agreement.

Radio stations 

Notes:
 1 WGWG-LP is owned by Venture Technologies Group, and was operated by Tribune under a local marketing agreement. Tribune was supposed to hold the LMA until 2015, the FCC's deadline for converting low-power television stations to digital broadcasting, however due to low ratings, Weigel Broadcasting announced on December 30, 2014, that they would take over the Station's LMA from Tribune & would change formats. The LMA with Tribune ended on February 23, 2015, when Weigel took over the Station & changed the format to Oldies. The Callsign was also changed to WRME-LP. Although licensed as a television station on channel 6, it is also operated as a radio station.
 2 Owned by iHeart, and was operated by Tribune from August 2009 to December 1, 2018. The Station broadcast WITI's news & weather updates & most of its local programming. The simulcast of WITI & the operations by Tribune ended on December 1, 2018, when WMIL-FM switched its HD3's subchannel format.
 3 From 2008 to 2013, Local TV LLC had operated KWGN-TV and KPLR-TV under local marketing agreements with KDVR and KTVI.

Other assets
Tribune Broadcasting owned WGN America, a basic cable/satellite channel that operated as a superstation feed of flagship station WGN-TV until December 2014 (one of four superstations owned by Tribune, along with remaining Tribune superstations KTLA, KWGN-TV, and WPIX).

It owned the Chicago-based regional cable news channel Chicagoland Television (CLTV); and had a 30% ownership interest in Food Network (the remaining controlling interest in that channel is held by Discovery, Inc.)

Tribune Broadcasting also owned two digital multicast networks: This TV (launched in 2008, 50%), which airs television series, and Antenna TV (100%, launched in 2010), which aired movies and children's programming.

Carriage controversies

April 2012 DirecTV dispute 
At midnight ET on April 1, 2012, Tribune's carriage agreement with DirecTV ended, resulting in all 23 Tribune Broadcasting-owned stations and WGN America to be pulled from the satellite provider at midnight in the respective time zones of the markets carrying the broadcast stations. Tribune was seeking retransmission consent payments from DirecTV, which under previous carriage agreements, the company received for carriage of WGN America, but not for its local broadcast stations. On April 3, 2012, DirecTV filed a complaint with the Federal Communications Commission claiming that Tribune Company representatives had negotiated in bad faith and that the company had inappropriately transferred control over its broadcast licenses to its bankruptcy creditors. The dispute lasted four days, ending on April 5, 2012, when the two companies reached a new carriage agreement for the Tribune Broadcasting stations and WGN America (the stations were restored to DirecTV subscribers at 9:00 p.m. ET that evening); DirecTV's complaint to the FCC against Tribune was dropped as part of the agreement.

August 2012 Cablevision dispute 
At midnight Eastern Time on August 16, 2012, Tribune's carriage agreement with Cablevision expired, resulting in New York City's WPIX, Hartford's WCCT-TV and Philadelphia's WPHL-TV being pulled from Cablevision systems in New York, New Jersey, and Connecticut. Additionally, KWGN-TV was pulled from Optimum West systems in Colorado and Wyoming (which were sold to Charter Communications in 2013). Cablevision accused Tribune of demanding higher carriage fees (that Cablevision claimed totaled in the tens of millions of dollars) to be used to help pay off debt, and alleged that it illegally bundled carriage agreements for WPIX and Hartford's WTIC-TV (which was initially unaffected, unlike sister station WCCT, due to a separate carriage agreement but was later pulled from Cablevision's Connecticut systems as well), which the company denied, stating its approach complied with FCC regulations. The stations and WGN America (which was also dropped due to the dispute) were restored through a new carriage agreement that was reached on October 26, following a plea by Connecticut State Senator Gayle Slossberg for the FCC to intervene in the dispute.

June 2016 DISH dispute
Tribune's carriage agreement with DISH and Tribune-affiliated ABC, CBS, The CW, FOX, MyNetworkTV, & NBC over-the-air stations expired on June 12, 2016.

Unable to come to terms on a new distribution agreement, Tribune Media Co. said its 42 television stations and the WGN America cable channel had gone dark on satellite broadcaster Dish Network Corp.

Approximately 5 million Dish subscribers in 33 markets across 34 states and the District of Columbia lost access to local TV stations owned by Tribune late Sunday. About 7 million do not receiving the WGN America network.

At issue are fees Tribune is seeking for carriage of its stations and WGN America. In a statement, Dish Network said Tribune was demanding an unreasonable price increase for its local channels, which are available free with an antenna. In addition, an increase for WGN America is not warranted because the channel no longer carries Chicago Cubs games and its ratings are down in Dish homes, the satellite broadcaster said.

“Tribune is using local viewers as leverage to raise rates for WGN America—a channel that is in decline,” said Warren Schlichting, executive vice president of programming for Dish.

Dish has offered to provide free antennas to its customers so they can receive the Tribune television stations. Tribune owned or operated 42 stations in many of the nation's biggest markets including New York, Los Angeles, Chicago and Washington, D.C. Many of its stations were affiliated with The CW and MyNetworkTV but it also owns affiliates of CBS, ABC, NBC, and Fox.

Tribune said the deal it offered Dish was the same one it has with other pay-TV distributors. ”Dish refuses to reach an agreement based on fair-market value,” said Tribune Media spokesman Gary Weitman.

Both companies said they were willing to extend the current agreement but neither side could even agree on terms for that.

Such fights over distribution fees have become commonplace in the television industry. Tribune has been seeking increases for WGN America as part of its plan to transition the channel from one that was highly dependent on reruns and Chicago sports to a network with lots of original programming that can compete with channels such as FX and AMC."

On September 3, Tribune and Dish came to a long-term agreement ending the three-month-long dispute.

January 2019 Charter Spectrum dispute 
Due to a carriage dispute with Charter Spectrum, Tribune Broadcasting announced at the end of 2018 that 33 stations would go dark beginning in the new year. Although the block was scheduled to begin at midnight on January 1, 2019, negotiations extended the deadline to January 2, 2019. Tribune blocked stations such as WJW, KDAF, WGNO, WTTV, KTLA, KCPQ, WPIX, WGN-TV, and WGN America. The stations returned to the system on January 11 after a nine-day blackout.

References 

The CW
Mass media companies established in 1924
Companies that filed for Chapter 11 bankruptcy in 2008
Defunct broadcasting companies of the United States
Nexstar Media Group
2019 mergers and acquisitions
Mass media companies disestablished in 2019